Cantrainea philipiana is a species of small sea snail with calcareous opercula, a marine gastropod mollusk in the family Colloniidae.

Distribution
This marine species occurs in the Lesser Antilles off Dominica.

References

External links
 To Encyclopedia of Life
 To World Register of Marine Species

Colloniidae
Gastropods described in 1889